Elgula sometimes misspelled as (Colguula, Celgula) is a town in the South-central Mudug region of Somalia.It is located in Galmudug state and situated in Ceelgula District.

Location
The town is 797 km away from Mogadishu , 119 km away from Gaalkacyo and 173 km away from Hobyo.

It is situated between the city of Gaalkacyo and the Ancient Port city of Hobyo.

Education
The town has Ceelgula primary school and Ceelgula secondary school.

Radio Station
The town has a privately-owned radio station outlet that airs 10 hours a day. The station focuses on local news as well as news on the regions controlled by Galmudug state, which includes daily news, sports, music, education, health and political interviews.

Health Facilities
There are 2 health clinics in the town as well as a hospital undergoing construction currently.

References

External links
Ceelguula

Populated places in Mudug
Populated places in Somalia
Cities in Somalia
Galmudug